The 2010 NAIA Football National Championship was played on December 18, 2010 as the 55th Annual Russell Athletic NAIA Football National Championship.

The championship game was played at Barron Stadium in Rome, Georgia.  The championship was won by the Carroll Fighting Saints over the Sioux Falls Cougars by a score of 10–7.  With their 6th championship, Carroll moved to within one of the all-time NAIA record of seven held by Texas A&I.  The win also snapped Sioux Falls' 42-game winning streak; their last loss was also at the hands of Carroll in the 2007 NAIA championship game.

A total of sixteen teams participated in a single-elimination tournament from across the United States.

Tournament bracket

  * denotes OT.

Game details

First round

#11 Marian at No. 8 Ottawa

Ottawa completed its worst game on offense in terms of total yards for the season, only coming up with 246. Ottawa did manage to take the lead twice, but in the third quarter Marian would take the lead for good.

Defensively, Ottawa's Eric Wilson returned a 98-yard interception for a touchdown but the final score would fall 15 points short to end at 35–20.

#12 McKendree at No. 6 McPherson

McKendree took off to a 14 point lead in the first quarter and maintained the lead for the remainder of the game, dumping McPherson for their second first-round playoff loss in two years. It was the first loss for McPherson in the season, which ended with a final record of 10–1.

McKendree scored five touchdowns and claimed victory in the end with a final score of 38–14.

References

NAIA Football National Championship
Sioux Falls Cougars football games
Carroll Fighting Saints football
NAIA Football National Championship
NAIA Football National Championship